2005 Júbilo Iwata season

Competitions

Domestic results

J. League 1

League table

Results summary

Result round by round

Matches

Emperor's Cup

Júbilo Iwata received a bye to the fourth round as being part of the J.League Division 1.

J. League Cup

Júbilo Iwata received a bye to the quarter-finals in order to avoid scheduling conflicts due to their participation in the AFC Champions League.
Quarter-finals

International results

AFC Champions League

Júbilo Iwata qualified for this tournament as winners of the 2003 Emperor's Cup.

Friendlies

Player statistics

Other pages
 J. League official site

Jubilo Iwata
Júbilo Iwata seasons